Bahram Sadeghi (8 January 1937, in Najaf-Ābād, Isfahan  – 3 January 1985, in Tehran) was an Iranian poet and modernist fiction writer.
Sadeghi's characters, many of them failed government employees and frustrated intellectuals, are consumed by anxiety and terror, and at times even undergo Kafkaesque transmutations and mutilations.

Works

Novella 
The Heavenly Kingdom (in Persian: ملکوت)

Short story collection 
The Trench and the Empty Canteens (in Persian:سنگر و قمقمه‌های خالی)

Short stories 
Tomorrow is on the way
Obsession
Action-packed
The evening prayer
Counter-impact
Mr. writer has just started to write

References

External links 
Some of Sadeghi's stories to read online

1937 births
1985 deaths
Iranian male writers
Iranian male short story writers
People from Najafabad